Brooklyn High School may refer to:

Brooklyn Center High School in Brooklyn Center, Minnesota.
Brooklyn High School (Ohio) in Brooklyn, Ohio
Brooklyn High School of the Arts in New York City
Brooklyn Technical High School in Brooklyn, New York